The following lists events that happened during 1857 in Chile.

Incumbents
President of Chile: Manuel Montt

Events

December
29 December - The National Party (Chile, 1857–1933) is established.

Births
20 January - Luis Claro Solar (d. 1945)
18 April - Pedro Nolasco Cruz Vergara (d. 1939)
15 July - Henrique Bernardelli (d. 1936)

Deaths
date unknown - Joaquín Vicuña (b. 1786)
14 September - John Williams Wilson (b. 1798)

References 

 
1850s in Chile
Chile
Chile